California's Mount Shasta has been the subject of an unusually large number of myths and legends. In particular, it is often said there is a secret city beneath its peaks. In some stories, the city is no longer inhabited, while in others, it is inhabited by a technologically advanced society of human beings or mythical creatures.

Native American legends
According to local indigenous tribes, namely the Klamath people, Mount Shasta is inhabited by the spirit chief Skell, who descended from heaven to the mountain's summit. Skell fought with the Spirit of the Below-World, Llao, who resided at Mount Mazama, by throwing hot rocks and lava, probably representing the volcanic eruptions at both mountains. Writer Joaquin Miller recorded various related legends in the 1870s.

Lemuria
Mount Shasta has also been a focus for non-Native American legends, centered on a hidden city (called Telos) of advanced beings from the lost continent of Lemuria. The legend grew from an offhand mention of Lemuria in the 1880s. In 1899, Frederick Spencer Oliver published A Dweller on Two Planets, which claimed that survivors from a sunken continent called Lemuria were living in or on Mount Shasta. Oliver's Lemurians lived in a complex of tunnels beneath the mountain and occasionally were seen walking the surface dressed in white robes.

In 1931, Harvey Spencer Lewis, using the pseudonym Wishar S[penle] Cerve, wrote a book published by AMORC about the hidden Lemurians of Mount Shasta that a bibliography on Mount Shasta described as "responsible for the legend's widespread popularity". This belief has been incorporated into numerous occult religions, including "I AM" Activity, The Summit Lighthouse, Church Universal and Triumphant, Love Has Won, and Kryon.

Count of St. Germain
According to Guy Ballard, while hiking on Mount Shasta, he encountered a man who introduced himself as Count of St. Germain, who is said to have started Ballard on the path to discovering the teachings that would become the "I AM" Activity religious movement.

J. C. Brown
According to a legend, J. C. Brown was a British prospector who discovered a lost underground city beneath Mount Shasta in 1904.

He told his story 30 years later to John C. Root, who proceeded to gather an exploration team in Stockton, California. About 80 people joined the team, but, on the day the team was to set out, Brown did not show up. Brown was not heard from again.

References

Mount Shasta
Pseudoarchaeology
Mount Shasta